Fort Hill Park (formerly Fort Knyphausen) is a .845-acre public green space located in the St. George neighborhood of Staten Island, New York. It is located on the slope of the northernmost hilltop on the Dongan Hills ridge.

During the American Revolutionary War, the borough was a stronghold of the loyalist movement, welcoming General William Howe’s occupying army in August 1776. At the summit of Fort Hill, Prussian general Wilhelm von Knyphausen (1716–1800) founded an earthen redoubt (along with the King's Orange Rangers). In honor of its commander, the structure carried the name Fort Knyphausen for the duration of the Revolutionary War.

In January 1780, Von Knyphausen successfully repelled an American assault against the fort. The fort also served as a base of operations in raids launched against American positions in New Jersey. Following the British evacuation of Staten Island in November 1783, the fort was abandoned, with its square base later used as a reservoir.

The parcel that became Fort Hill Park remained undeveloped as a result of its topography. The City purchased the property, and it was dedicated as a park on August 2, 2004. In 2008, the blue indigo granite and bluestone capstone wall was restored, along with a bluestone sidewalk to enhance the historic appearance of the park.

See also
 Wilhelm von Knyphausen

References

External links
 Parks Department web site

St. George, Staten Island
Parks in Staten Island
Forts in New York City